In chemistry, T-shaped molecular geometry describes the structures of some molecules where a central atom has three ligands. Ordinarily, three-coordinated compounds adopt trigonal planar or pyramidal geometries. Examples of T-shaped molecules are the halogen trifluorides, such as ClF3.

According to VSEPR theory, T-shaped geometry results when three ligands and two lone pairs of electrons are bonded to the central atom, written in AXE notation as AX3E2. The T-shaped geometry is related to the trigonal bipyramidal molecular geometry for AX5 molecules with three equatorial and two axial ligands. In an AX3E2 molecule, the two lone pairs occupy two equatorial positions, and the three ligand atoms occupy the two axial positions as well as one equatorial position. The three atoms bond at 90° angles on one side of the central atom, producing the T shape.

The trifluoroxenate(II) anion, has been investigated as a possible first example of an AX3E3 molecule, which might be expected by VSEPR reasoning to have six electron pairs in an octahedral arrangement with both the three lone pairs and the three ligands in a mer or T-shaped orientations. Although this anion has been detected in the gas phase, attempts at synthesis in solution and experimental structure determination were unsuccessful. A computational chemistry study showed a distorted planar Y-shaped geometry with the smallest F–Xe–F bond angle equal to 69°, rather than 90° as in a T-shaped geometry.

See also
AXE method

References

External links
Chem| Chemistry, Structures, and 3D Molecules 
Indiana University Molecular Structure Center
 Interactive molecular examples for point groups
Molecular Modeling
Animated Trigonal Planar Visual

Molecular geometry